The Rucăr-Bran Pass, also called in English the Bran Pass, is a mountain pass in Romania, linking the counties of Brașov and Argeș. It has some of the most spectacular natural views in Romania, looking over the Bucegi Mountains of the Southern Carpathians.

The communes of Fundata (including Șirnea village) and Moieciu, both in Brașov County, lie within the Pass, which ends in Bran.

History
In 1382, Bran Castle was built by the Transylvanian Saxons of Brașov to defend the Pass from the Ottomans.

In the year 1413, a customs post in the Pass was licensed by the ruler of Wallachia. This charged a duty on all goods brought through the Pass. Southwards the usual trade route ran to Cetățeni, branching out to Popești and Hârșova.

Notes

External links

Mountain passes of Romania
Southern Carpathians
Geography of Argeș County
Geography of Brașov County